Cimicoxib (UR-8880 trade name Cimalgex) is a nonsteroidal anti-inflammatory drug (NSAID) used in veterinary medicine to treat dogs for pain and inflammation associated with osteoarthritis and for the management of pain and inflammation associated with surgery. It acts as a COX-2 inhibitor.

Synthesis

Reaction of the imine with TosMIC in the presence of potassium carbonate leads to what may be viewed as 2+3 cycloaddition of the nitrogen analogue of a ketene to form the imidazole ring.

References

COX-2 inhibitors
Nonsteroidal anti-inflammatory drugs
Imidazoles
Fluoroarenes
Organochlorides
Sulfonamides